ZCW may refer to:

Al-Zahra College for Women, a private college in Muscat, Oman
ZCW, the National Rail code for Canada Water station, London, England